What Changed Charley Farthing? (also known as The Bananas Boat), is a 1975 comedy film directed by Sidney Hayers and starring Doug McClure, Lionel Jeffries, and Hayley Mills. It is based on the 1965 novel of the same title by John Harris.

Premise
Roaming sailor Charley Farthing is paid to give safe passage out of revolutionary Cuba to a young woman (Hayley Mills) and her father (Lionel Jeffries).

Cast
Doug McClure as Charley Farthing
Lionel Jeffries as Houlihan
Hayley Mills as Jenny
Warren Mitchell as MacGregor
Dilys Hamlett as Miss Parchment
Alberto de Mendoza as Jumbo
Victor Israel as Christmas	
Fernando Sancho as Lupez	
Luis Marín as Hatta
Ricardo Palacios as Greek Captain

Production
The film was shot at Pinewood Studios near London. It was filmed on location in Aguilas in Spain, which filled in for Havana. The film's  sets were designed by the art directors Lionel Couch and Enrique Alarcón.

Release
What Changed Charley Farthing? was not released in the United States until January 1976, when it was retitled The Bananas Boat.

Critical reception
TV Guide called the film "a total misfire." The Spectator called it "a nice piece of slapstick". Filmink called it "a painful attempt at an African Queen-type jaunt... with Mills attempting an odd accent and seeming unhappy."

References

External links

 
What Changed Charley Farthing? at Letterbox DVD
What Changed Charley Farthing? at BFI

1975 films
1975 comedy films
British comedy films
Spanish comedy films
Films shot at Pinewood Studios
Films directed by Sidney Hayers
Films set in Cuba
1970s English-language films
1970s British films